The Pirnaischer Platz is a square in Dresden, Germany. It is the site of the city's Landhaus.

Squares in Dresden